Nama may refer to:

Nama, or Naman, a variety of the Khoekhoe language of Namibia, spoken by the Nama people
The Nama variety of the Nambu languages of Papua New Guinea
The Nama/Dama dialect of the Tigon language of Cameroon

See also
Litzlitz language of Vanuatu, also known as Naman